FC Shinarar, is a defunct Armenian football club from Hrazdan, Kotayk Province. The club was dissolved in 1992 and is no longer active in professional football.

References

Defunct football clubs in Armenia
1994 disestablishments in Armenia